John Dawson Winter III is the seventh studio album by Johnny Winter, released in 1974. It again follows Winter's pattern of mixing original songs with cover versions, including covering an Allen Toussaint song for the second album running.

Track listing
All tracks composed by Johnny Winter; except where indicated
"Rock & Roll People" (John Lennon) - 2:44
"Golden Olden Days of Rock & Roll" (Vic Thomas) - 3:02
"Self-Destructive Blues" - 3:27
"Raised on Rock" (Mark James) - 4:42
"Stranger" - 3:54
"Mind Over Matter" (Allen Toussaint) - 4:14
"Roll with Me" (Rick Derringer) - 3:04
"Love Song to Me" - 2:05
"Pick Up on My Mojo" - 3:21
"Lay Down Your Sorrows" (Barry Mann, Cynthia Weil) - 4:09
"Sweet Papa John" - 3:07

Personnel 
Johnny Winter - guitar, harmonica, vocals
Edgar Winter - keyboards, saxophone, vocals
Rick Derringer - guitar
Randy Jo Hobbs - bass
Richard Hughes - drums
Kenny Ascher - keyboards
Michael Brecker - saxophone
Randy Brecker - trumpet
Lewis del Gatto - saxophone
Paul Prestopino - steel guitar
David Taylor - trombone
Mark Kreider - backing vocals on "Raised on Rock"

References

1974 albums
Johnny Winter albums
Columbia Records albums